In astronomy, a conjunction occurs when two astronomical objects or spacecraft have either the same right ascension or the same ecliptic longitude, usually as observed from Earth.

When two objects always appear close to the ecliptic—such as two planets, the Moon and a planet, or the Sun and a planet—this fact implies an apparent close approach between the objects as seen in the sky. A related word, appulse, is the minimum apparent separation in the sky of two astronomical objects.

Conjunctions involve either two objects in the Solar System or one object in the Solar System and a more distant object, such as a star. A conjunction is an apparent phenomenon caused by the observer's perspective: the two objects involved are not actually close to one another in space. Conjunctions between two bright objects close to the ecliptic, such as two bright planets, can be seen with the naked eye.

The conjunction symbol is not used in modern astronomy. It continues to be used in astrology.

Passing close

More generally, in the particular case of two planets, it means that they merely have the same right ascension (and hence the same hour angle). This is called conjunction in right ascension. However, there is also the term conjunction in ecliptic longitude. At such conjunction both objects have the same ecliptic longitude. Conjunction in right ascension and conjunction in ecliptic longitude do not normally take place at the same time, but in most cases nearly at the same time. However, at triple conjunctions, it is possible that a conjunction only in right ascension (or ecliptic length) occurs. At the time of conjunction – it does not matter if in right ascension or in ecliptic longitude – the involved planets are close together upon the celestial sphere. In the vast majority of such cases, one of the planets will appear to pass north or south of the other.

Passing closer

However, if two celestial bodies attain the same declination at the time of a conjunction in right ascension (or the same ecliptic latitude at a conjunction in ecliptic longitude), the one that is closer to the Earth will pass in front of the other. In such a case, a syzygy takes place. If one object moves into the shadow of another, the event is an eclipse. For example, if the Moon passes into the shadow of Earth and disappears from view, this event is called a lunar eclipse. If the visible disk of the nearer object is considerably smaller than that of the farther object, the event is called a transit. When Mercury passes in front of the Sun, it is a transit of Mercury, and when Venus passes in front of the Sun, it is a transit of Venus. When the nearer object appears larger than the farther one, it will completely obscure its smaller companion; this is called an occultation. An example of an occultation is when the Moon passes between Earth and the Sun, causing the Sun to disappear either entirely or partially. This phenomenon is commonly known as a solar eclipse. Occultations in which the larger body is neither the Sun nor the Moon are very rare. More frequent, however, is an occultation of a planet by the Moon. Several such events are visible every year from various places on Earth.

Position of the observer
A conjunction, as a phenomenon of perspective, is an event that involves two astronomical bodies seen by an observer on the Earth. Times and details depend only very slightly on the observer's location on the Earth's surface, with the differences being greatest for conjunctions involving the Moon because of its relative closeness, but even for the Moon the time of a conjunction never differs by more than a few hours.

Superior and inferior
As seen from a planet that is superior, if an inferior planet is on the opposite side of the Sun, it is in superior conjunction with the Sun. An inferior conjunction occurs when the two planets lie in a line on the same side of the Sun. In an inferior conjunction, the superior planet is "in opposition" to the Sun as seen from the inferior planet.

The terms "inferior conjunction" and "superior conjunction" are used in particular for the planets Mercury and Venus, which are inferior planets as seen from the Earth. However, this definition can be applied to any pair of planets, as seen from the one farther from the Sun.

A planet (or asteroid or comet) is simply said to be in conjunction, when it is in conjunction with the Sun, as seen from the Earth. The Moon is in conjunction with the Sun at New Moon.

Quasiconjunction
In a quasiconjunction, a planet in retrograde motion — always either Mercury or Venus, from the point of view of the Earth — will "drop back" in right ascension until it almost allows another planet to overtake it, but then the former planet will resume its forward motion and thereafter appear to draw away from it again. This will occur in the morning sky, before dawn. The reverse may happen in the evening sky after dusk, with Mercury or Venus entering retrograde motion just as it is about to overtake another planet (often Mercury and Venus are both of the planets involved, and when this situation arises they may remain in very close visual proximity for several days or even longer). The quasiconjunction is reckoned as occurring at the time the distance in right ascension between the two planets is smallest, even though, when declination is taken into account, they may appear closer together shortly before or after this.

Average interval between conjunctions

The interval between two conjunctions involving the same two planets is not constant, but the average interval between two similar conjunctions can be calculated from the periods of the planets. The "speed" at which a planet goes around the sun, in terms of revolutions per time, is given by the inverse of its period, and the speed difference between two planets is the difference between these. For conjunctions of two planets beyond the orbit of Earth, the average time interval between two conjunctions is the time it takes for 360° to be covered by that speed difference, so the average interval is:

This does not apply of course to the intervals between the individual conjunctions of a triple conjunction. Conjunctions between a planet inside the orbit of Earth (Venus or Mercury) and a planet outside are a bit more complicated. As the outer planet swings around from being in opposition to the sun to being east of the sun, then in superior conjunction with the sun, then west of the sun, and back to opposition, it will be in conjunction with Venus or Mercury an odd number of times. So the average interval between, say, the first conjunction of one set and the first of the next set will be equal to the average interval between its oppositions with the sun. As for conjunctions between Mercury and Venus, each time Venus goes from maximum elongation to the east of the sun to maximum elongation west of the sun and then back to east of the sun, an even number of conjunctions with Mercury take place. The average interval between corresponding conjunctions (for example the first of one set and the first of the next) is 1.599 years, based on the orbital speeds of Venus and Earth.

The following table gives these average intervals, in sidereal years, for combinations of the nine traditional planets. Since Pluto is in resonance with Neptune the period used is 1.5 times that of Neptune, slightly different from the current value. The interval is then exactly thrice the period of Neptune.

Notable conjunctions

1953 BC 

On February 27, 1953 BC Mercury, Venus, Mars and Saturn formed a group with an angular diametre of 26.45 arc minutes. Jupiter was on the same day only a few degrees away, so that on this day all 5 bright planets could be found in an area measuring only 4.33 degrees. David Pankenier and David Nivison have suggested that this conjunction occurred at the beginning of the Xia dynasty in China.

929 

A triple conjunction between Mars and Jupiter occurred. At the first conjunction on May 26th, 929 Mars, whose brightness was -1.8 mag, stood 3.1 degrees south of Jupiter with a brightness of -2.6 mag. The second conjunction took place on July 4th, 929, whereby Mars stood 5.7 degrees south of Jupiter. Both planets were -2.8 mag bright. On August 18th, 929 the -1.9 mag bright Mars stood 4.7 degrees south of Jupiter, which was -2.6 mag bright.

The second conjunction might have been from all conjunctions between outer planets since Birth of Christ that at which both planets had greatest brightness. At all other conjunctions between outer planets at least one planet was dimmer.

1503 

Between December 22, 1503 and December 27, 1503 all thright bright outer planets Mars, Jupiter and Saturn reached their opposition to sun and stood therefore close together at the nocturnal sky. During the opposition period 1503 Mars stood 3 times in conjunction with Jupiter (October 5, 1503, January 19, 1504 and February 8, 1504) and 3 times in conjunction with Saturn (October 14, 1503, December 26, 1503 and March 7, 1504). Jupiter and Saturn stood on May 24, 1504 in close conjunction with an angular separation of 19 arcminutes.

1604 

On October 9, 1604 a conjunction between Mars and Jupiter took place, whereby Mars passed Jupiter 1.8 degrees southward. Only two degrees away from Jupiter Kepler's Supernova appeared on the same day. This was perhaps the only time in recorded history a supernova took place near a conjunction of two planets.

1899
In early December 1899 the Sun and the naked-eye planets appeared to lie within a band 35 degrees wide along the ecliptic as seen from the Earth. As a consequence, over the period 1–4 December 1899, the Moon reached conjunction with, in order, Jupiter, Uranus, the Sun, Mercury, Mars, Saturn and Venus. Most of these conjunctions were not visible because of the glare of the Sun.

1962
Over the period 4–6 February 1962, in a rare series of events, Mercury and Venus reached conjunction as observed from the Earth, followed by Venus and Jupiter, then by Mars and Saturn. Conjunctions took place between the Moon and, in turn, Mars, Saturn, the Sun, Mercury, Venus and Jupiter. Mercury also reached inferior conjunction with the Sun. The conjunction between the Moon and the Sun at new Moon produced a total solar eclipse visible in Indonesia and the Pacific Ocean,
when these five naked-eye planets were visible in the vicinity of the Sun in the sky.

1987
Mercury, Venus and Mars separately reached conjunction with each other, and each separately with the Sun, within a 7-day period in August 1987 as seen from the Earth. The Moon also reached conjunction with each of these bodies on 24 August. However, none of these conjunctions were observable due to the glare of the Sun.

2000
In May 2000, in a very rare event, several planets lay in the vicinity of the Sun in the sky as seen from the Earth, and a series of conjunctions took place. Jupiter, Mercury and Saturn each reached conjunction with the Sun in the period 8–10 May. These three planets in turn were in conjunction with each other and with Venus over a period of a few weeks. However, most of these conjunctions were not visible from the Earth because of the glare from the Sun. NASA referred to May 5 as the date of the conjunction.

2002
Venus, Mars and Saturn appeared close together in the evening sky in early May 2002, with a conjunction of Mars and Saturn occurring on 4 May. This was followed by a conjunction of Venus and Saturn on 7 May, and another of Venus and Mars on 10 May when their angular separation was only 18 arcminutes. A series of conjunctions between the Moon and, in order, Saturn, Mars and Venus took place on 14 May, although it was not possible to observe all these in darkness from any single location on the Earth.

2007
A conjunction of the Moon and Mars took place on 24 December 2007, very close to the time of the full Moon and at the time when Mars was at opposition to the Sun. Mars and the full Moon appeared close together in the sky worldwide, with an occultation of Mars occurring for observers in some far northern locations.
A similar conjunction took place on 21 May 2016.

2008
A conjunction of Venus and Jupiter occurred on 1 December 2008, and several hours later both planets separately reached conjunction with the crescent Moon. An occultation of Venus by the Moon was visible from some locations. The three objects appeared close together in the sky from any location on the Earth.

2012

2013

At the end of May, Mercury, Venus and Jupiter went through a series of conjunctions only a few days apart.

2015

June 30 - Venus and Jupiter come close together in a planetary conjunction; they came approximately 1/3 a degree apart. The conjunction had been nicknamed the "Star of Bethlehem."

2016

On the morning of January 9, Venus and Saturn came together in a conjunction

On August 27, Mercury and Venus were in conjunction, followed by a conjunction of Venus and Jupiter, meaning that the three planets were very close together in the evening sky.

2017

On the morning of November 13, Venus and Jupiter were in conjunction, meaning that they appeared close together in the morning sky.

2018
On the early hours of January 7, Mars and Jupiter were in conjunction. The pair was only 0.25 degrees apart in the sky at its closest.

2020

During most of February, March, and April, Mars, Jupiter, and Saturn were close to each other, and so they underwent a series of conjunctions: on March 20, Mars was in conjunction with Jupiter, and on March 31, Mars was in conjunction with Saturn.
On December 21, Jupiter and Saturn appeared at their closest separation in the sky since 1623, in an event known as a great conjunction.

2022

Planetoid Pallas passes Sirius, the brightest star in the sky, on October 9th southly in a distance of 8.5 arcminutes (source: Astrolutz 2022, ISBN 978-3-7534-7124-2). As Sirius is far south of the ecliptic only few objects of the solar system can be seen from earth close to Sirius.
At this occasion Pallas had not only the lowest angular distance to Sirius in the 21st century, but also since its discovery in 1802.
In the 19th century the greatest approach of Pallas and Sirius took place on October 11, 1879, when 8.6 mag bright Pallas passed Sirius 1.3° southwestly and in the 20th century the lowest distance between Pallas and Sirius was reached on October 12, 1962, when Pallas, whose brightness was also 8.6 mag, stood 1.4° southwest of the brightest star in the sky.

Conjunctions of planets in right ascension 2005–2020

See also 
 Appulse
 Astrometry
 Astronomical transit
 Transit of Earth from Mars
 Transit of Mercury
 Transit of Venus
 Occultation
 Elongation (astronomy)
 Great conjunction
 Opposition (astronomy)
 Spherical astronomy
 Syzygy (astronomy)
 Triple conjunction

References

External links 
 
 Venus - Jupiter 2015 & 2016 conjunctions
 
 Planets conjunctions and mutual occultations 1000BC to 3000AD
 Conjunctions of planets with the main asteroids
 

Astrometry